Los Garzones International Airport is an international airport serving the city of Montería in the Córdoba Department of Colombia.  It is the only airport in the department that can handle modern jets (up to Airbus A330 size). On normal days, the airport receives 25 to 30 takeoffs and landings.  It is one of the busiest airports in Colombia in terms of passenger flow.

In 2008, the consortium "AirPlan", formed by the following companies, was awarded a bidding process: Malibú S.A .; Fernando Mazuera y Cía., Information and Technology S.A., Portales Urbanos S.A., Colombian Society of Commercial Investments (Socinsa), Superstores and Olympic Drugstores, Noarco S.A. and Integral Services for Networks and Communications that, together with the Chinese company CAH Colombia, propose works among which are the construction of a new terminal, reconditioning of the runways and taxiways and new security systems. Since 2010, the airport has an urban bus service that connects the air terminal with the main bus terminal in the city of Montería.

Currently Los Garzones receives between 22 and 25 commercial flights per day, managing to mobilize more than 83,000 passengers per month, however the average number of daily operations is 53, it is also EasyFly's base of operations, so it has an overnight flight of aircraft and crews of said airline in the city

The Monteria VOR-DME (Ident: MTR) is located on the field.

History 

The first plane to reach Monteria was a hydrofoil, which was floating on the banks of the Sinu River thanks to the expertise of the German aviator Helmuth Von Krohn . They had been introduced to Colombia by the Colombo German Air Transport Company "Scadta", born in Barranquilla on December 5, 1919, when the deeds were signed at the second notary of Barranquilla. The partners were the Germans Werner Kaemerer, Stuart Hosie, Alberto Tietjen and the Colombians Ernesto Cortizzos (the first President of the airline), Rafael Palacio, Cristóbal Restrepo, Jacobo Correa and Aristides Noguera.

These aircraft were of the model Junker F-13, monoplanes of low wing and of completely metallic construction, whose motors had to be modified to be able to operate efficiently in the climatic conditions of the country. They were 9.50 meters long and 3.50 meters high. Its flight capacity was 850 kilometers and could carry up to 4 passengers, in addition to the two crew members. Due to the topographic characteristics of the country, the Junkers were adapted two floats in order to perform aquatization in the rivers of different populations.

The first of the Junker F-13, baptized with the name of "Colombia", was brought to Barranquilla in 1920 by a German crew, composed by the pilot Helmuth von Krohn and the engineers Guillermo Schorbusch and Fritz Hammer. Von Krohn died in 1924 along with Ernesto Cortizzos, when the Junker "Tolima" plane crashed in Bocas Cenizas, in which they attended the culmination of the works of the tajamares.

Unfortunately, the time of its best commercial moment coincided with the period of the Second World War and by the strategy of the US government, which considered it very dangerous that an airline with so much German influence flying so close to the Panama Canal, the German pilots were fired. June 8, 1940. Six days later, on June 14, in the same notary where "Scadta" was created, the deed was signed to convert it into "Avianca".

Aviation had many protagonists in the Sinu territory. In the 1930s, passenger flights from Scadta landed in Montería and Lorica. Then, in the 40s, Avianca -produced from the liquidation of Scadta- and Lansa -Lineas Aéreas Nacionales SA-, which also covered Montería and Lorica. And in 1947 came the DC3, type C-47, from Sam - Sociedad Aeronáutica de Medellín, which initially made the transport of cargo to Planeta Rica.

The old San Jerónimo de Montería airport was inaugurated in 1937 on the land that is now occupied by the San Jerónimo Hospital and the Tacasuán Recreational Center. "Avianca" started its operations there with the famous Douglas DC-3. These planes arrived in the country in October 1939, and were flying at the incredible speed, at that time, of 200 miles per hour. The most famous DC-3 was the HK-111, commanded by Captain Alfredo Crismatt, graciously baptized by the people as the "Doctor", since "begins with one", "continues with one" and "ends with one".

The arrival of the Douglas DC-4, which required a longer runway, led to the opening in the 60s of the Berástegui Airport, on the grounds of the "San Antonio" farm, which was owned by General Gustavo Rojas Pinilla. The next step was the construction of the current airport of Los Garzones, inaugurated in 1974, to open the skies of Córdoba to modern Jets.

In 2016 Montería received 968,481 passengers, while in 2017 it received 943,772 passengers according to data published by the Grupo Aeroportuario del Sureste.

Works at the airport 
Los Garzones will have a track extension and varied services for the community. The concession contract concluded between Airplan, Aerocivil and the Olaya Herrera Public Establishment for the modernization of six airports in the north central zone of Colombia, includes significant infrastructure works at Los Garzones airport, whose investments amount to more than 50 billion of pesos, in value to the year of 2008. The modernization plan is for five years, counted from March 2009. It is also planned to internationalize the airport, with two main destinations being Panama City and Miami.

The airport will have the following modernizations

 Expansion of passenger terminal 
 Expansion of the waiting room 
 New energy substation 
 Extension of the runway from 30m to 45m wide; and from 1800m to 2300 meters long 
 Installation of a new luggage band 
 Construction of cargo terminal, which will have water and sanitary facilities and parking 
 Approach lighting system(ALS)
 VIP lounge

Airlines and destinations

Destinations map

Passenger

Cargo

Accidents and incidents 
 On May 2, 1990, a Grumman G-159 Gulfstream I ran off the end of the runway and caught fire.  All 6 occupants made it out of the plane safely.
 On November 23, 2016, the front landing gear of a general aviation aircraft fell off and caused major damage to the aircraft's underside. Both of the aircraft's 2 occupants made it out safely.

See also
Transport in Colombia
List of airports in Colombia

References

External links
Los Garzones Airport at OpenStreetMap
Los Garzones Airport at OurAirports

SARPA Air 
Los Garzones infrastructure 
Los Garzones news 
Runway closure due to takeoff accident 
 Los Garzones aviation weather 

Airports in Colombia
Buildings and structures in Córdoba Department